David Dalton Yezzi (born 1966) is an American poet, editor, actor, and professor. He currently teaches poetry in the Writing Seminars at Johns Hopkins University.

Life
Yezzi was born in Albany, New York He attended The Doane Stuart School. Yezzi earned a bachelor's degree in theater from Carnegie Mellon University and a master of fine arts degree in creative writing from Columbia University School of the Arts.

Career
Yezzi was Director of the Unterberg Poetry Center of the 92nd Street Y in New York City from 2001 to 2005 and has worked as executive editor and, then, poetry editor of The New Criterion, associate editor of Parnassus: Poetry in Review, and was on the staff of The New York Observer. He is a professor in the Writing Seminars at Johns Hopkins University and a former editor of The Hopkins Review.
 
Yezzi was a co-founder of the San Francisco theater company, Thick Description, and has performed in works by Shakespeare, Shaw, Brecht, Goethe, Williams, and others in the United States and Europe. In March 2010, Verse Theater Manhattan presented Yezzi's evening of verse monologues, Dirty Dan & Other Travesties, at the Bowery Poetry Club, with Yezzi performing "Tomorrow & Tomorrow." In October 2021, he performed the title role in The Baltimore Shakespeare Factory's production of King Lear.

In 1998, he was awarded a Wallace Stegner Fellowship from Stanford University (1998–2000).

His poems have been published in literary journals including The Atlantic, Poetry, The Yale Review, The Paris Review, The New Republic, Poetry Daily and The New Criterion. His literary essays and reviews have appeared in The New York Times Book Review, The New York Sun, The New Yorker, The Wall Street Journal, The (London) Times Literary Supplement, Poetry and elsewhere.

Yezzi's poem "The Call" was included in The Best American Poetry 2006 and "Minding Rites" appeared in The Best American Poetry 2012.

In December 2008, Azores was chosen as a Slate magazine "Best Book of 2008." In 2015, Birds of the Air was a finalist for the Poets' Prize.

Bibliography

Non-fiction
 Late Romance: Anthony Hecht--A Poet's Life (St. Martin's Press, 2023), 464 pages,

Poetry
 More Things in Heaven (Measure Press, 2022), 156 pages, 
 Black Sea (Carnegie Mellon University Press, 2018), poetry, 74 pages, 
 Birds of the Air (Carnegie Mellon University Press, 2013), poetry, 90 pages, 
 Azores (Swallow Press/Ohio University Press, 2008), poetry, 56 pages, 
 The Hidden Model (TriQuarterly/Northwestern University Press, 2003), poetry, 96 pages,

Chapbooks
 Two Ranges [Vertical] by Ernest Hilbert and David Yezzi (Nemean Lion Press, 2013), hand-sewn, signed-limited concertina book
 Tomorrow & Tomorrow, with an afterword by Denis Donoghue (Exot Books, 2012), 
 Such Root Satisfaction, 3 X 5 [Three by David Yezzi, Five by Ernest Hilbert] (Nemean Lion Press, 2010)
 A Fletching of Hackles: Fresh Verse by Ernest Hilbert and David Yezzi (Nemean Lion Press, 2009)
 Sad Is Eros (Aralia Press, 2003)

Anthologies (edited)
 The Swallow Anthology of New American Poets (Swallow Press/Ohio University Press, 2009), poetry, 376 pages, 

List of poems

Plays
 Schnauzer: A Play In One Act (EXOT Books, 2019), Play-In-Verse, 82 pages,

Libretti 
 His libretto for a new chamber opera by composer David Conte, Firebird Motel, premiered in 2003 and was released on CD by Arsis.

References

External links

  Biographical sketch of Yezzi at the 92nd Street Y Web site, also available on a Google cache at 
 "An Expert on Human Failings" brief article on Anthony Hecht in The New York Times Book Review
 "Bacon's Theater of the Absurd" on the paintings of Francis Bacon in The New Criterion
 "The Amis Country" on the poetry of Kingsley Amis in The New Criterion
 "Cough"
 "False Fire"
 "Acceptance Speech"
 

Poets from New York (state)
American magazine editors
Carnegie Mellon University College of Fine Arts alumni
Writers from Albany, New York
Writers from New York City
1966 births
Living people
Columbia University School of the Arts alumni
American male poets
20th-century American poets
20th-century American male writers
21st-century American poets
21st-century American male writers
American opera librettists
21st-century American non-fiction writers
American male non-fiction writers
The Atlantic (magazine) people